Ignacio Lorenzo de Armas (1706 - unknown) was a Spanish politician who served as mayor of San Antonio, Texas in 1738 and 1764. His family arrived in San Antonio from the Canary Islands in 1731 with other Canarian families in order to populate this region.

Biography 
Juan Ignacio Lorenzo de Armas was born about 1706, in San Sebastián de La Gomera, Canary Islands. His parents were Roque Lorenzo De Armas and Teresa De Aviles. He had a brother, Martin Lorenzo de Armas, who was younger than him and also settled in San Antonio. In 1731, when he was 22 years old, his family arrived in San Antonio with other families from the Canary Islands  to settle this unpopulated region,.

In 1738 and 1764 De Armas was named mayor of San Antonio, replacing mayors Juan Curbelo and Luis Antonio Menchaca respectively.

De Armas married another local Canarian, Ana Cabrera, with whom he had two children.

References 

Mayors of San Antonio
People from La Gomera
People of Spanish Texas
Texas Isleño people
1706 births
Year of death missing